Choke is the Beautiful South's second album, released in 1990. It was pushed to number 2 in the charts after the release of the band's only number-1 single, "A Little Time".

The album was followed by two more singles, both of which were flops. "My Book", which became the band's first single to chart outside the top 40, peaked at number 43, and "Let Love Speak Up Itself" reached number 51.

Non-German releases of the album contain 11 tracks. The twelfth track, exclusive to the German release, was intended for the album from the beginning but was removed at a late stage of production. The cassette release of the standard version feature a long silence at the end of the first side, possibly indicating that this would have been the location originally intended for the track.

Critical reception
Trouser Press wrote that "Choke makes it clear that the Beautiful South has ample pop sense and pure venom to keep its unique act going for quite a while." The New York Times wrote positively that the album "reads like an 11-chapter novella from a criminally sane mind."

Track listing
All tracks by Paul Heaton, David Rotheray unless otherwise noted

 "Tonight I Fancy Myself" – 3:26
 "My Book" – 3:18
 "Let Love Speak Up Itself" – 5:04
 "Should've Kept My Eyes Shut" – 3:27
 "I've Come For My Award" – 3:14
 "Lips" – 1:11
 "I Think The Answer's Yes" – 5:15
 "A Little Time" – 3:00
 "Mother's Pride" – 2:03
 "I Hate You (But You're Interesting)" – 3:46
 "The Rising Of Grafton Street" – 3:05
 "What You See Is What You Get"  (Tony Hester)  – 4:28 (German release only)

Non-LP/CD B-Sides
The Beautiful South included unreleased material on the B-sides of the singles taken from their albums.

from the "A Little Time" 12" single and CDEP
"A Little Time"
"In Other Words I Hate You"
"What You See Is What You Get" (Tony Hester)

from the "My Book" 12" single and CDEP
"My Book"
"Big Beautiful South"
"Bigger Doesn't Mean Better"
"Speak To Me"

from the "Let Love Speak Up Itself" 12" single and CDEP
"Let Love Speak Up Itself"
"Danielle Steel (The Enemy Within)” (this is a longer version of 3:39 later edited to 3:06, using an earlier fade-out for the limited edition bonus disc of Carry on up the Charts)
"Love Wars" (Womack & Womack) (this is a longer version of 3:54 later edited to 3:41, using an earlier fade-out for the limited edition bonus disc of Carry on up the Charts)
"Headbutting Husband"

Personnel

Paul Heaton - vocals
Dave Hemingway - vocals
Briana Corrigan - vocals
Dave Rotheray - guitar
Sean Welch - bass
Dave Stead - drums

Additional personnel
Gary Barnacle – Flute, Saxophone
Kevin Brown – Saxophone
Damon Butcher – Piano, Keyboards
Rupert Coulson – Engineer
Mike Hedges – Producer
Ben Kape – Engineer
Jody Kitson – Percussion
Lance Phillips – Engineer
Tony Robinson – Trumpet
Pete Wingfield – Piano

References

The Beautiful South albums
1990 albums
Albums produced by Mike Hedges
Go! Discs albums